Mahmoud al-Zahar (born 6 May 1945) is a Palestinian politician. He is a co-founder of Hamas and a member of the Hamas leadership in the Gaza Strip. Al-Zahar served as foreign minister in the Hamas-dominated Palestinian Authority Government of March 2006 (also known as the First Haniyeh Government) that was sworn in on 20 March 2006. On 10 September 2003, his eldest son Khaled was killed in an Israeli air strike, and his other son, a member of the Hamas military wing, the Izz ad-Din al-Qassam Brigades, was killed by Israeli fire in Gaza on 15 January 2008.

Early life

Little is known about al-Zahar's early life beyond the fact that he was born in Gaza City in 1945, and the report that he was born to a Palestinian father and an Egyptian mother.

At the age of 26, he graduated from the Cairo University Faculty of Medicine and five years later he got his master's degree in General Surgery from Ain Shams University, Cairo. He then became the adviser to the Palestinian Health Minister, and helped create the Palestinian Medical Society and was one of the primary founders of the Islamic University in Gaza in 1978.

Career with Hamas
Al-Zahar was instrumental in the creation of Hamas in 1987. He was detained by Israeli authorities in 1988, and eventually exiled to Lebanon along with a large number of other Islamist activists in 1992. He returned to Gaza after about a year. In response to a campaign of suicide bombings by the Izzedine al-Qassam Brigades (IQB), on 10 September 2003 an Israeli F-16 dropped a large bomb over his house in the Rimal neighborhood of Gaza, which only managed to slightly wound him, while his eldest son Khaled, and a personal bodyguard were killed, and twenty others wounded including his daughter Rima. His house was destroyed, and ten other houses nearby were damaged, as well as the nearby Al-Rahman mosque. The resulting funeral was attended by over two thousand mourners, who called on Hamas to avenge the deaths.

Al-Zahar has remained a senior official and spokesperson for the group and was rumoured to have succeeded to leadership of the group following Israel's assassination of Ahmed Yassin in 2004. Hamas routinely denied this rumour, but refused to name who their new leader was, for fear of Israeli action. Al-Zahar was elected for Hamas to the Palestinian Legislative Council at the 2006 Palestinian legislative election, and continues to be a member (as no elections for the PLC have taken place since). He was foreign minister in the Hamas-dominated Palestinian Authority Government of March 2006 (also known as the First Haniyeh Government) that was sworn in on 20 March 2006. Al-Zahar's main challenge was to break the United States-led diplomatic boycott of the Haniyeh government. On 14 June 2006, Palestinian officials reported that al-Zahar brought twelve suitcases stuffed with US$26.7 million in cash into Gaza through its border with Egypt, which was controlled by Palestinian Authority forces loyal to Palestinian Authority President Mahmoud Abbas of Fatah. Al-Zahar was at least the third known Hamas official to be caught with large sums of cash: Hamas spokesman Sami Abu Zuhri had been stopped the previous month.

On 15 January 2008, al-Zahar's son Hussam, a member of IQB, was reportedly killed in an IDF air strike on a car full of Hamas fighters in northern Gaza.

In 2010, al-Zahar revealed to the press that Yasser Arafat had instructed Hamas to launch militant attacks—including suicide bombings—against Israel in 2000, due to peace talks not going anywhere.

Incitement controversy
During the 2008–2009 Gaza War, al-Zahar, during a television broadcast, was reported to have said that the Israelis "have legitimised the murder of their own children by killing the children of Palestine... They have legitimised the killing of their people all over the world by killing our people." This remark was widely reported as advocating the "murder" of Jewish children worldwide. Maajid Nawaz condemned the remarks as "depraved" and "perverse Al-Qaeda logic," writing that, as opposed to Hamas, "Israel does not have an active policy of deliberately capturing children to murder them, or even deliberately murdering civilians for that matter." Basim Naim, the minister of health in the Hamas government in Gaza, said Zahar's statements had been misquoted and mistranslated, and that what he did was to "warn that by carrying out these barbaric massacres of children and women, and by destroying our mosques, the Zionists are creating the conditions for people to believe it is justified or legitimate to take revenge....Dr Zahar did not even mention 'Jews' in his comments".

Park51 endorsement
In an interview on New York's WABC radio, al-Zahar was asked by Aaron Klein to comment on the construction of the mosque Park51 near the World Trade Center site. Zahar, endorsed the building, by saying, "We have to build the mosque as you are allowed to build the church and the Israeli are building their holy places. We have to build everywhere – in every area we have Muslims, we have to pray, and this mosque is the only site of prayer especially for the people when they are looking to be in the group – not individual".

Personal life
Al-Zahar has had four children with his wife Summaya, including their first son, Khaled, (1974-10 September 2003), daughters Rima (born in 1983), and Huda and son Hussam (??- 15 January 2008).

References

External links

 Profile: Hamas' Mahmoud Zahhar
 2007 interview with Der Spiegel
 Islamic state? Not yet – Article stating that he is a creationist.
 No Peace Without Hamas – Op-Ed by Zahar in The Washington Post.

1945 births
Living people
People from Jerusalem
Palestinian Sunni Muslims
Hamas leaders
Foreign ministers of the Palestinian National Authority
Government ministers of the Palestinian National Authority
Palestinian surgeons
Members of the 2006 Palestinian Legislative Council
Muslim creationists
Cairo University alumni
Ain Shams University alumni